Josef Schmitt (22. August 1875 – 1945), later Ritter Josef Schmitt was a German Lawyer, Knight, and Privy Councilor. He was born in Bavaria to Ritter Josef von Schmitt, who was the advisor to Prince Luitpold of Bavaria and a privy councilor. Josef Schmitt was, in later life, Deputy Chairman of the Supervisory Board of SKF, the  J. Mich AG  in Bamberg, the  AG Steinfels, formerly Hch. Knab  in Steinfels, the  H. Henniger Reifbräu AG  in Erlangen and the  Baumwollindustrie Erlangen-Bamberg AG   in Erlangen. He was also a member of the supervisory boards of the  AG für Licht- und Kraftversorgung  in Munich, the  Porzellanfabrik Kloster Veilsdorf AG , the  porcelain manufacturer C. M. Hutschenreuther AG  in Altrohlau and the  Rizzibräu AG  in Kulmbach. He was a member of the Bavarian State Committee of  Deutsche Bank and Disconto-Gesellschaft  and the Allianz and Stuttgarter Verein Versicherungs-AG, later Allianz.

Early life 
Josef was born into a devout Catholic family, and was originally brought into law through his father, Josef von Schmitt, who was a Bavarian privy councillor an advisor to the crown, and his uncle, Gottfried von Schmitt, who served as member of the Imperial Council of Bavaria, which served as the aristocratic government body of Bavaria.

Education and beginnings
After Josef Schmitt attended high school in Münnerstadt and served one year as a military volunteer, he studied law at the University of Würzburg. In 1896 he became a member of the Corps Bavaria. Schmitt later practised law from 1898 to 1901 at the District Court of Bamberg and studied in 1900 at the University of Erlangen–Nuremberg to become a doctor of law. Schmitt graduated in 1901 from the state bankruptcy and joined his father, the renowned Josef von Schmitt's law firm, which he took over in 1908. In 1902, Schmitt received the admission as a lawyer in the District Court Bamberg and in 1903 at the Higher Regional Court. During the First World War, he participated from 1914 to 1918 as Adjutant of the II. Bavarian Artillery Corps in Würzburg, at which time he was awarded an Iron Cross. At the same time, he became chairman of the board of the bar association Bamberg.

Later life and positions

Enterprises
Josef Schmitt was chairman of the board of the Mechanischen Seilerwarenfabrik AG in Bamberg and the  Kaliko-Fabrik AG in Bamberg. He was Deputy Chairman of the Supervisory Board of SKF, the  J. Mich AG  in Bamberg, the  AG Steinfels, formerly Hch. Knab  in Steinfels, the  H. Henniger Reifbräu AG  in Erlangen and the  Baumwollindustrie Erlangen-Bamberg AG   in Erlangen. He was also a member of the supervisory boards of the  AG für Licht- und Kraftversorgung  in Munich, the  Porzellanfabrik Kloster Veilsdorf AG , the  porcelain manufacturer C. M. Hutschenreuther AG  in Altrohlau and the  Rizzibräu AG  in Kulmbach. He was a member of the Bavarian State Committee of  Deutsche Bank and Disconto-Gesellschaft  and the Allianz and Stuttgarter Verein Versicherungs-AG, later Allianz

Privy Councilor
Josef Schmitt was later appointed Privy Councilor to the crown of Bavaria. He was also awarded the Knight's cross of St. Michael and Order of Merit of the Bavarian Crown and was therefore known as Ritter Josef v. Schmitt

Awards 
 Appointment to the Privy Councilor
 Award of the Knight's Cross of the Order of Saint Michael
 Awarding Iron Cross II. Class
 The Order of Merit of the Bavarian Crown

Literature 
  Schmitt, Josef  in  Reich Manual of German Society – The Handbook of Personalities in Word and Image.  Second Volume, p. 1668, Deutscher Wirtschaftsverlag, Berlin 1931

See also 
Military Order of Max Joseph

References

1875 births
1945 deaths
People from Bamberg
University of Würzburg alumni
Josef
German Army personnel of World War I